Dypvåg is a former municipality in the old Aust-Agder county, Norway. The  municipality existed from 1838 until its dissolution in 1960 when it was merged into the present-day municipality of Tvedestrand which is in Agder county. The administrative centre was the village of Dypvåg where the Dypvåg Church is located.

History
The parish of Dybvaag (later spelled "Dypvåg") was established as a civil municipality on 1 January 1838 (see formannskapsdistrikt law).  On 1 January 1881, a part of the municipality of Holt (population: 52) was transferred to Dypvåg. Then later, on 1 January 1887, an uninhabited part of neighboring Søndeled municipality was transferred to Dypvåg. On 1 January 1902, the western half of Dypvåg (population: 1,892) was separated from the rest of Dypvåg (population: 3,235) to form the new municipality of Flosta. 

During the 1960s, there were many municipal mergers across Norway due to the work of the Schei Committee. On 1 January 1960, the municipality of Dypvåg (population: 1,805) was merged with the neighboring municipality of Holt and the town of Tvedestrand to form a new, enlarged municipality of Tvedestrand which had a population of 6,432.

Name
The municipality (originally the parish) is named after the old Dybvaag farm ( or ) in what is now the village of Dypvåg, since the first Dypvåg Church was built there.  The first element comes from dype which means "deep" and the last element is våg which means "water" or "harbor".  The spelling of the name was changed from Dybvaag to Dypvåg around the beginning of the 20th century.

Government
All municipalities in Norway, including Dypvåg, are responsible for primary education (through 10th grade), outpatient health services, senior citizen services, unemployment and other social services, zoning, economic development, and municipal roads. The municipality was governed by a municipal council of elected representatives, which in turn elected a mayor.

Municipal council
The municipal council  of Dypvåg was made up of 21 representatives that were elected to four year terms.  The party breakdown of the final municipal council was as follows:

Notable residents
Jens Marcussen (1926-2007), a politician
Kristian Vilhelm Koren Schjelderup, Jr. (1894-1980), a theologian
Peter Olrog Schjøtt (1833-1926), a philologist

See also
List of former municipalities of Norway

References

External links

Tvedestrand
Former municipalities of Norway
1838 establishments in Norway
1960 disestablishments in Norway